Sumner is a town in Worth County, Georgia, United States. The population was 427 at the 2010 census. It is part of the Albany, Georgia Metropolitan Statistical Area. Sumner High School is listed on the National Register of Historic Places.

Geography

Sumner is located at  (31.510979, -83.738315).

According to the United States Census Bureau, the town has a total area of 1.1 square miles (2.8 km), all land.

History
The community was named after John C. "Jack" Sumner, the original owner of the town site.

The Georgia General Assembly incorporated Sumner as a town in 1883.

Demographics

As of the census of 2000, there were 309 people, 110 households, and 87 families residing in the town. The racial makeup of the town was 83.82% White, 14.89% African American, 0.97% Native American, and 0.32% from two or more races.

There were 110 households, out of which 32.7% had children under the age of 18 living with them, 62.7% were married couples living together, 8.2% had a female householder with no husband present, and 20.9% were non-families. 18.2% of all households were made up of individuals, and 6.4% had someone living alone who was 65 years of age or older.  The average household size was 2.81 and the average family size was 3.14.

In the town, the population was spread out, with 24.6% under the age of 18, 12.3% from 18 to 24, 24.6% from 25 to 44, 23.0% from 45 to 64, and 15.5% who were 65 years of age or older.  The median age was 35 years. For every 100 females, there were 90.7 males.  For every 100 females age 18 and over, there were 91.0 males.

The median income for a household in the town was $30,781, and the median income for a family was $33,750. Males had a median income of $23,000 versus $16,875 for females. The per capita income for the town was $13,532.  About 13.4% of families and 16.9% of the population were below the poverty line, including 20.3% of those under the age of eighteen and 22.9% of those 65 or over.

References

Towns in Worth County, Georgia
Towns in Georgia (U.S. state)
Albany metropolitan area, Georgia